Fulgencio Berdugo (June 14, 1918 – February 3, 2003) was a Colombian football player. He was born in Barranquilla, Colombia on June 14, 1918 and died in the same city on February 3, 2003. He played for different national and international soccer teams, including the Colombia national football team in the Copa América of 1945, scoring goals against Bolivia and Ecuador.

Career
Berdugo played club football for Junior de Barranquilla, helping the club to a runner's-up finish in Colombia's first professional tournament. Berdugo also played on the island of Cuba and helped develop its professional soccer league.

Honours
Central American and Caribbean Games Gold Medal (1): 1946

References

1918 births
2003 deaths
Colombian footballers
Colombia international footballers
Atlético Junior footballers
Central American and Caribbean Games gold medalists for Colombia
Competitors at the 1946 Central American and Caribbean Games
Association football forwards
Footballers from Barranquilla
Central American and Caribbean Games medalists in football
20th-century Colombian people
21st-century Colombian people